Wenn die Musik nicht wär (English: If It Were Not for Music) is a 1935 German drama film directed by Carmine Gallone and starring Paul Hörbiger, Willi Schaeffers and Ida Wüst. The film was shot at the Grunewald Studios in Berlin. It is based on the novel Der Kraft-Mayr by Ernst von Wolzogen. The film's art direction was by Fritz Maurischat and Karl Weber.

Cast
 Paul Hörbiger as Florian Mayr, genannt 'Kraft-Mayr'
 Willi Schaeffers as Konsul Burmeester
 Ida Wüst as Seine Frau
 Karin Hardt as Thekla, seine Tochter
 Sybille Schmitz as Ilonka Badacz
 Harry Hardt as Baron Poldi
 Luis Rainer as Franz Liszt
 Annemarie Steinsieck as Gräfin Tockenburg
 Herta Worell as Dirigentin des Damenorchesters
 Josefine Dora as Olga, Theklas Kindermädchen
 Emmy Wyda as Frau Stoltenhagen
 Hubert von Meyerinck as Kusjmitsch von Prschitschkin
 Wolf Ackva
 Rudolf Biebrach
 Max Ernst
 Hugo Flink
 Erich Heyn
 Helga Kalkum
 Günther Langenbeck
 Morvilius
 Karl Morvilius
 Otto Sauter-Sarto
 Walter Schramm-Duncker
 Max Wilmsen

References

Bibliography
 Klaus, Ulrich J. Deutsche Tonfilme: Jahrgang 1933. Klaus-Archiv, 1988.

External links 
 

1935 films
Films of Nazi Germany
German drama films
1935 drama films
1930s German-language films
Films directed by Carmine Gallone
Tobis Film films
German black-and-white films
1930s German films